Harry the Bunny is a children's television show on the channel BabyFirstTV. It features a plush "talking" bunny named Harry and his many adventures both inside his house and in his backyard. The show teaches things such as color recognition, counting, etc. and even delves into social interaction and emotions. The show is aimed primarily at preschool aged children.

Plot
Every day, there is an opportunity to discover something new to share with the viewers. From his colorful bedroom to the adventures of his backyard, Harry has plenty to do and learn when Harry's around. Sometimes his adventures incorporate skills such as counting and recognizing letters. On other times kids learn about emotions.

Harry usually greets the viewers with 'Hello little ones' or 'Hello everybody' or 'Hello funny bunnies'.

Transmission guide
A total of 55 editions published on 6 March 2008 to 3 May 2010 for five minute episode including education.
Season 1; 34 episodes: 6 March 2008 - 14 December 2009
Season 2; 21 episodes: 9 February 2010 - 3 May 2010

Crossover Series
Harry & Larry: Pros who Help! is a crossover show that co-stars Harry and a 2D animated macaw named Larry, who also stars in a show aired on the same channel, "VocabuLarry" or "Larry & Friends". The show airs on the same channel. The show teaches education learning about new words and commonly known jobs, such as teaching, being a doctor, firefighter, musician, conductor, or an artist.

Merchandising
BabyFirst's store sells Harry the Bunny plush toys and toys that include Harry the Bunny in it.

Home media 
Mill Creek Entertainment distributes DVDs of Harry the Bunny along with other shows in the BabyFirst DVDs collection.

References

External links

https://www.commonsensemedia.org/tv-reviews/harry-the-bunny

2000s American children's television series
American preschool education television series
American television shows featuring puppetry
Television series about rabbits and hares